Parthenopolis may refer to:

Parthenopolis (Chalcidice), an ancient town of the Chalcidice, Greece
Parthenopolis (Sintice), an ancient town of Sintice, now in Bulgaria